Yoo Song-hwa (born 6 April 1968) is a South Korean politician previously served as the Director of the Chunchugwan Press Center at the Blue House under President Moon Jae-in - the third woman to assume such post.

Upon the beginning of Moon's presidency, Yoo was appointed as the Private Secretary to the First Lady Kim Jung-sook. As part of the Blue House staffer reshuffle in January 2019, she was promoted as the Director of the Press Center, Chunchugwan, at the Blue House, the only secretary-level staff at the Office of the President not working at secretariat buildings. She is the third woman to assume the post after Kim Hyun and Seo Young-kyo who were appointed by President Roh Moo-hyun 11 years ago.

In January 2020, Yoo resigned the post to stand for the upcoming general election in April. She applied to run as her party's candidate for Seoul Nowon A constituency but lost the primary to the incumbent Ko Yong-jin.

Yoo previously served as a Nowon District Council member from 1995 to 2002. In 2002 election, she was placed as the number 6 of the proportional list but could not be elected as a Seoul Metropolitan Council member. In 2003 she joined then-President-elect Roh Moo-hyun's transition team and later Offices of Senior Presidential Secretaries for civil societies and personnel affairs. She later worked for her party as public relations staff and later standing deputy spokesperson. In 1988 she was the president of Ewha Womans University's student union.

Yoo holds two degrees - a bachelor in economics from Ewha Womans University and a master's in urban administration from University of Seoul. She also completed a doctorate programme on North Korean studies at Dongguk University.

Electoral history

References 

Living people
1968 births
South Korean government officials
Dongguk University alumni
University of Seoul alumni
Ewha Womans University alumni
People from Goheung County
Minjoo Party of Korea politicians